Selita is an Albanian tribe or fis from the Mirdita region. Several places in Albania are toponyms originating from the name of the tribe, including the Selitë of Mallakastër, 
Selita in Mirditë as well as two villages in Tiranë, Selita and Selitë Mali.

References

Tribes of Albania